A Tribute to Teresa Teng - A Rocking Farewell (告别的摇滚) is a tribute album released in July 1995 on Beijing-based label Bamboo Book Culture (竹书文化), shortly after Teresa Teng's death on May 8, 1995. It features ten of Teng's songs covered by several of Beijing's most well-known first-generation rock bands. The album is a sincere tribute to Teng as one of the first pop singers to be heard in China.

Track listing

Personnel 
Personnel as listed in the album's liner notes are:

Musicians 

 Wu Tong - vocals (tracks 1, 4, 10); percussion (track 4), woodwinds (track 4)
 Zheng Jun - vocals (tracks 2, 8, 10)
 Zang Tianshuo - vocals, keyboards (tracks 3, 6)
 Qin Yong - vocals (tracks 5, 9, 10)
 Guo Dawei - vocals (track 7); chorus (track 10)
 Li Qiang - guitar (tracks 1, 4)
 Zhao Wei - guitar (tracks 1, 4); percussion (track 4)
 Zhu Hongmao - guitar (tracks 2, 8)
 Qin Qi - guitar (tracks 3, 6)
 Li Tong - guitar (5, 9); background vocals (track 9); chorus (track 10)
 Ding Wu - guitar (tracks 7, 10)
 Liu Yijun - guitar (tracks 7, 10); chorus (track 10)
 Zhou Xu - upright bass (track 1); electric bass (track 4)
 Chen Jin - bass (tracks 2, 7, 8, 10); chorus (track 10)
 Liu Wentai - bass (tracks 3, 6)
 Wang Wenjie - bass (tracks 5, 9)
 Feng Jun - drums (tracks 1, 4)
 Cheng Jin - drums (tracks 2, 8)
 Ma He - drums (tracks 3, 6)
 Zhao Mingyi - drums (tracks 5, 9); chorus (track 10)
 Zhao Nian - drums (tracks 7, 10); chorus (track 10)
 Luan Shu - keyboards (track 7)
 Feng Xiaobao - keyboards (5, 9); background vocals (track 9)
 Liu Xiaosong - percussion (tracks 3, 6)
 Zhang Yongguang - percussion (track 7)
 Dai Bing - background vocals (tracks 3, 6)
 Xu Tian - background vocals (track 6)
 Hu Zhiliang - saxophone (tracks 3, 6); background vocals (track 6)

Production 

 Koetsu Otomo - producer
 Shigeo Miyamoto - recording, mixing
 Bobby Hata - mastering

Notes and references

1995 compilation albums
Teresa Teng tribute albums